Rajesh Kumar Singh is an Indian politician and a member of 13th and 17th Legislative Assembly of Uttar Pradesh, of India. He represents the ‘Kanth (Assembly constituency)’  in Moradabad district of Uttar Pradesh.

Political career
Rajesh Kumar Singh contested Uttar Pradesh Assembly Election as Bharatiya Janata Party candidate and defeated his close contestant Anees Ur Rehman from Samajwadi Party with a margin of 2,348 votes.

Posts held

References

Uttar Pradesh MLAs 2017–2022
Year of birth missing (living people)
Living people
Bharatiya Janata Party politicians from Uttar Pradesh
People from Moradabad district